ABC South West WA is an ABC Local Radio station based in Bunbury.  The station broadcasts to the South West region of Western Australia.  This includes the towns of Busselton, Bridgetown, Manjimup and Margaret River.

The station broadcasts through the following main AM transmitters, as well as some low power FM repeaters:

6BS 684 AM
6BR 1044 AM
6MJ 738 AM

When local programs are not broadcast the station is a relay of ABC South Coast and 720 ABC Perth.

References

External links
 ABC South West WA

See also
 List of radio stations in Australia

South West WA
Radio stations in Western Australia
Bunbury, Western Australia